A Tam quan (Chữ Hán: 三關) or Tam môn (Chữ Hán: 三門) is a style of traditional gateway symbolic of Vietnamese Buddhism, it has three aisles (traditionally, the middle aisle is the largest and the two side aisles are smaller) not only are they applied in Buddhist works, they are also commonly applied to other religious works such as Confucianism, Taoism, Vietnamese folk religion, Đạo Mẫu, and Christianity. In addition, they are also applied to non-religious modern buildings such as schools and People's committee buildings.

Origin and meaning 

The Tam quan carries the concept of "three ways of seeing" of Buddhism, including "hữu quan, 有觀)", "không quan, 空觀)" and "trung quan, 中觀)", representing the form (false), the void (anitya) and the middle of both.  The second explanation is that the three gates are the gates of the Three Jewels.  Another theory holds that the three gates are the "Samadhi" of the Zen sect. Therefore, countries that do not belong to Zen Buddhism do not have Tam quan as the entrance to the temple.

Tam quan gateways derive from Buddhist temple architecture that was transmitted from India to Vietnam via China.

Architecture 

Tam quan is mainly three gateways with the middle door usually larger than the two side doors. The wall of the gateway can be wooden or be made up of stone or brick. Above the gateway lays a tiled roof. The two sides of the path are often decorated with couplets, the front of the door is written with the name of the temple or the name of the gateway.

The common form of the gate 
The regular form of the gate has three gateways and is also the most common type. Typically Buddhist couplets in Hán văn (Literary Chinese) line the centre doorway. With the name of the place or the gate on a placard on the top of the centre gate.

Multiple floor gate 
Small gateways only make one floor, but when built on a larger scale, many places build two roofs or build upper floors. Brick and stone gates almost always have an upper level, although it may just be a fake upper floor to increase the gate's height. There are places built into three floors. When designing the upper floor, there is a pagoda that uses it to hang the bells, the plaques, and the drums used in temple rituals...

Four pillar gate 
Tam quan style of four Trụ biểu instead of building walls, uses four pillars, the middle two pillars are higher than the two side pillars to divide into three paths. Above, connecting the four Trụ biểu is a stylized beam to make the gate's centre.

The gateway of Láng Temple is characterized by a four Trụ biểu structure with a curved roof, giving the pagoda's Tam quan a unique and unique shape in the traditional architecture of Vietnam.

Some popular variations 
Variations of the Tam quan are found in some pagodas built into five aisles such as in the case of Sét temple, Hanoi.

Application in non-religious works 
Tam quan is applied to many non-religious public works in Vietnam.

Village gate 
Traditional Vietnamese village gates usually have only one path (although there are also some places built in the form of a Tam quan), but many places today will build a village gate in the form of a Tam quan to use as a kind of welcome gate.

Gallery

See also 

 Torana, in Indian temple architecture
 Paifang, in Chinese temple architecture
 Torii, in Japanese temple architecture
 Hongsalmun, in Korean temple architecture
 Iljumun, in Korean temple architecture

References

Sources 

 Nguyễn Bá Lăng. Vietnamese Buddhist Architecture Vol. II. Paris: Nguyễn Bá Lăng, 2001.

Buddhism in Vietnam
Architecture in Vietnam